The 2013 FedEx 400 benefiting Autism Speaks was a NASCAR Sprint Cup Series stock car race held on June 2, 2013, at Dover International Speedway in Dover, Delaware, United States. Contested over 400 laps on the 1–mile (1.6 km) oval, it was the thirteenth race of the 2013 Sprint Cup Series championship. Tony Stewart won the race, his first win of the season, snapping a 30–race winless streak, while Juan Pablo Montoya finished second. Jeff Gordon, Kyle Busch, and Brad Keselowski rounded out the top five.

Report

Background
The track's turns are banked at twenty-four degrees. The front stretch, the location of the finish line, is banked at nine degrees with the backstretch. The racetrack has seats for 113,000 spectators. Jimmie Johnson was the defending race winner after winning the event in the 2012 race.

Before the race, Johnson was leading the Drivers' Championship with 445 points, while Carl Edwards stood in second with 413 points. Matt Kenseth followed in the third with 394, nine ahead of Clint Bowyer in fourth, and 24 ahead of Kasey Kahne in fifth. Dale Earnhardt Jr., with 364, was in sixth; two ahead of Kevin Harvick, who was scored seventh. Eighth-placed Paul Menard was eleven points ahead of Martin Truex Jr. and twelve ahead of Brad Keselowski in ninth and tenth. Kyle Busch was eleventh with 332, while Aric Almirola completed the first twelve positions with 328 points.  In the Manufacturers' Championship, Chevrolet was leading with 83 points, five points ahead of Toyota. Ford was third after recording only 60 points before the race.

Practice and qualifying
Three practice sessions were held before the race. The first session, held on May 31, 2013, was 90 minutes long. The second and third, held a day later on June 1, 2013, were 55 and 60 minutes long. During the first practice session, Johnson was quickest with a time of 22.556, ahead of his team-mate Kahne and Kyle Busch in second and third. Kurt Busch followed in the fourth position, ahead of Jamie McMurray in fifth.

During qualifying, forty-three cars were entered. Denny Hamlin clinched his third pole position of the season, with a lap time of 22.788 seconds. After his qualifying run, Hamlin commented, "When I ran the lap, I wasn't in love with it.  Fundamentally, I knew I didn't do that great of a job. I'm still knocking off some rust. This is only my third race back."  He was joined on the front row of the grid by Truex Jr. Kyle Busch qualified third, Kenseth took fourth, and Ryan Newman started fifth. Mark Martin, Harvick, Keselowski, Joey Logano, and McMurray completed the first ten positions on the grid.

In the Saturday morning session, Kenseth was quickest, ahead of Kahne and Keselowski in second and third. Kyle and Kurt Busch followed in the fourth and fifth positions. Hamlin, Edwards, Bowyer, Johnson, and Juan Pablo Montoya rounded out ten quickest drivers in the session.  In the final practice session for the race, Kurt Busch was quickest with a time of 23.495 seconds. Kenseth followed in second, ahead of Montoya and Johnson in third and fourth. Jeff Gordon, who was 27th quickest in second practice, managed fifth.

Race

The green flag was waved at 1:15 pm ET, with Denny Hamlin leading the field. Hamlin got the lead at the green flag over 2nd-place Martin Truex Jr. By lap 12, Matt Kenseth was up to 2nd place and right behind Hamlin. As they battled for the lead, Kyle Busch caught up and took the lead on lap 24. Shortly after lap 30, Danica Patrick was forced to make a green-flag pit stop after contact with David Stremme. Busch continued to lead the race, lapping several cars. He nearly lapped 22nd-place Jimmie Johnson until a round of green-flag pit stops allowed Johnson to stay on the lead lap by pitting early. On lap 81, the first caution of the race occurred for debris in turn 2. Tony Stewart got the free pass on this caution. Following the restart, Busch maintained the lead. On lap 128, there was another caution due to debris in turn 3. On the restart following this caution, Kenseth gained the lead from Busch. On lap 159, race leader Kenseth blew an engine. As a result, Busch regained the lead and the third caution of the day would be brought out on lap 161.  Busch maintained the lead after a round of pit stops under the caution. On the restart, he led the race ahead of Truex Jr.

At the halfway point of the race, cloud cover began to increase. Busch's lead narrowed and Johnson caught up to him. Johnson eventually passed Busch for the lead on lap 206. He maintained the lead after a round of green-flag pit stops. On lap 279, Truex Jr. blew an engine, bringing out another caution on lap 280. The leaders pitted during the caution, and Johnson won the battle off pit road. He would lead the race after the restart. On lap 299, there was a wreck involving Ryan Newman and David Gilliland on the backstretch. This wreck brought out the fifth caution of the race on lap 301, in which Hamlin would lead at the restart following different pit strategies. Hamlin continued to maintain the lead until another caution was brought out on lap 318 from a spin by Kasey Kahne in turn 2.  All the leaders came to pit road during this caution except Kurt Busch and Jeff Gordon. Ku. Busch led the race following the restart, but Johnson caught up and regained it on lap 326. The seventh caution of the race was brought out on lap 378, when Hamlin got into the turn 1 wall. The leaders pitted under this caution, with Juan Pablo Montoya getting the lead ahead of Johnson on pit road. On the restart following this caution, Johnson took the lead. However, Johnson was black-flagged for jumping the restart on lap 381.  This driver was forced to come to pit road on lap 385 and Montoya led the race. On lap 398, Stewart took the lead from Montoya. Stewart went on to win the race, giving him his first win of the season.

Post-race
Following the race, Keselowski's car failed post-race inspection because the car's front end was too low to the ground, resulting in a six-point penalty for Keselowski and a $25,000 fine for his crew chief Paul Wolfe, who had returned for the first time after a three-week suspension for infractions in the 2013 NRA 500. Car owner, Roger Penske was also penalized six owner's points. An official from Penske Racing said that the infraction was caused by a part failure, but the team is not expected to appeal the penalties.

Results

Qualifying

Race results

Notes

 Points include 3 Chase for the Sprint Cup points for winning, 1 point for leading a lap, and 1 point for most laps led.

Standings after the race

Drivers' Championship standings

Manufacturers' Championship standings

Note: Only the first twelve positions are included for the driver standings.

References

FedEx 400
FedEx 400
FedEx 400
NASCAR races at Dover Motor Speedway